Modelling and Simulation in Materials Science and Engineering is a peer-reviewed scientific journal published by the IOP Publishing eight times per year.

The journal covers computational materials science including properties, structure, and behavior of all classes of materials at scales from the atomic to the macroscopic. This includes electronic structure/properties of materials determined by ab initio and/or semi-empirical methods, atomic level properties of materials, microstructural level phenomena, continuum-level modelling pertaining to material behaviour, and modelling behaviour in service. Mechanical, microstructural, electronic, chemical, biological, and optical properties of materials are also of interest.

The editors-in-chief is Javier Llorca (Polytechnic University of Madrid & IMDEA Materials Institute, Spain).

Abstracting and indexing 
The journal is abstracted and indexed by:

See also
 Journal of Physics: Condensed Matter

External links
 

IOP Publishing academic journals
Materials science journals
Publications established in 1992
English-language journals